Estadio Saroldi (full name: Parque Federico Omar Saroldi) is a multi-use stadium in Montevideo, Uruguay.  It is currently used mostly for football matches.  The stadium holds 6,000 all seated.

Originally, the stadium was named as "Olimpia Park", as it served as home to Olimpia. After River Plate's goalkeeper Federico Omar Saroldi was fatally injured, during a match between his team and Central Español, the stadium starting to hold goalkeeper's name.

Ephemeris

 1990: CA Progreso used Estadio Saroldi, as it home stadium, for 1990 Copa Libertadores.
 1996 and 1998: River Plate played its Copa Conmebol matches against Porongos, Huracán Buceo and Rosario Central.
 2003: The stadium was also used by the Teros for 2003 Rugby World Cup's qualification matches during 2002

References

Saroldi
S
River Plate Montevideo
Prado, Montevideo